Southwark (Br  [ˈsʌðɨk]) South East was a parliamentary constituency in the Metropolitan Borough of Southwark, in South London.  It returned one Member of Parliament (MP)  to the House of Commons of the Parliament of the United Kingdom.

The constituency was created for the 1918 general election, and abolished for the 1950 general election, when it was largely replaced by the new Southwark constituency.

The constituency comprised the wards of St. George, St. John and St. Peter.  It covered most of East Walworth and Faraday wards, together with a sliver of Grange ward, in the modern day London Borough of Southwark.

Members of Parliament

Elections

Elections in the 1910s

Elections in the 1920s

Elections in the 1930s 

General Election 1939–40

Another General Election was required to take place before the end of 1940. The political parties had been making preparations for an election to take place and by the Autumn of 1939, the following candidates had been selected; 
Labour: Thomas Naylor
Conservative:

Elections in the 1940s

References

Parliamentary constituencies in London (historic)
Constituencies of the Parliament of the United Kingdom established in 1918
Constituencies of the Parliament of the United Kingdom disestablished in 1950
Politics of the London Borough of Southwark